Heartbeat Detector is a 2007 French film directed by Nicolas Klotz and starring Mathieu Amalric. The film is based on the 2000 novel by François Emmanuel.

Plot
The film centers on Kessler, a psychologist in the human resources department of the French branch of a long-established German firm. The firm has recently dismissed 50% of its workforce on criteria devised by Kessler. Rose, the vice-president of the company, requests Kessler to look into whether Jüst, the CEO is fit to do his job. The CEO discovers Kessler is investigating him and tells him that Rose, whose previous name was Kraus, has a Nazi past.

Kessler then discovers that Jüst's father headed a Nazi extermination group on the Eastern Front during World War II. Jews placed in the back of a closed truck were killed with the truck's exhaust gas. A device called a 'heartbeat detector' was then applied to discover any who had survived. Tormented by this memory Jüst attempts suicide.

The action then shifts from the company's politics to The Holocaust. An analogy is drawn between the desubjectivized corporate language used in downsizing and that used in the Nazi chain of command.

Cast
Mathieu Amalric as Simon Kessler
Michael Lonsdale as Mathias Jüst
Laetitia Spigarelli as Louisa
Delphine Chuillot as Isabelle
Édith Scob as Lucy Jüst
Jean-Pierre Kalfon as Karl Rose
Rémy Carpentier as Jacques Paolini

Reception 
The film has been considered in Film Comment as "a response to and comment on the present—the era of neoliberal capitalism, industrial downsizing, and the displaced and disaffected who do, or don’t, manage to adjust."  Other scholars pointed out how the film suggests a provocative parallel between neoliberal capitalism and the technical ideology that underpinned the Holocaust.

Trivia
There are two consecutive performances that the main character watches, one by a flamenco singer, Miguel Poveda, the other by a Portuguese group.

Awards and nominations
Copenhagen Film Festival (Denmark)
Won: Golden Swan – Best Actor (Mathieu Amalric)
César Awards (France)
Nominated: Best Actor – Supporting Role (Michael Lonsdale)
Gijón Film Festival (Spain)
Won: Best Actor (Mathieu Amalric)
Won: Best Art Direction (Antoine Platteau)
Nominated: Grand Prix Asturias – Best Feature (Nicolas Klotz)
São Paulo Film Festival (Brazil)
Won: Critics Award – International (Nicolas Klotz)

Festivals
Director's Fortnight

External links
 
 Interview with Mathieu Amalric and Nicolas Klotz from evene.fr
Review at the Chicago International Film Festival site.
Review from The Hollywood Reporter
Analysis from Film Comment

References 

2007 films
2007 drama films
French drama films
2000s French-language films
2000s French films